U-92 may refer to one of the following German submarines:

 , a Type U 87 submarine launched in 1917 and that served in the First World War until sunk on 9 September 1918
 During the First World War, Germany also had these submarines with similar names:
 , a Type UB III submarine launched in 1918 and surrendered on 21 November 1918; broken up at Bo'ness in 1920–21
 , a Type UC III submarine launched in 1918 and surrendered on 24 November 1918; dumped on beach at Falmouth after explosive trials 1921 and broken up in situ
 , a Type VIIC submarine that served in the Second World War until damaged in an air attack on 4 October 1944; scrapped 1944–45

Submarines of Germany